Maksim Nikolayevich Danilin (born 26 May 2001) is a Russian football player. He plays as a centre-forward for FC Torpedo-2 on loan from FC Dynamo Moscow.

Club career
He made his debut in the Russian Premier League for FC Dynamo Moscow on 9 July 2020 in a game against FC Ural Yekaterinburg, replacing Nikolay Komlichenko in the 67th minute. He made his first starting lineup appearance on 19 July 2020 in a game against FC Krasnodar.

On 25 February 2021, he joined FNL club FC Dynamo Bryansk on loan until the end of the 2020–21 season.

On 24 June 2021, he moved on a new loan to FC Neftekhimik Nizhnekamsk.

References

External links
 
 
 

2001 births
People from Novomoskovsky District
Living people
Russian footballers
Russia youth international footballers
Association football forwards
FC Dynamo Moscow players
FC Dynamo Bryansk players
FC Neftekhimik Nizhnekamsk players
FC Torpedo-2 players
Russian Premier League players
Russian First League players
Russian Second League players
Sportspeople from Tula Oblast